Zherdevka (also Zerdevka) is an interceptor aircraft air base in Russia located  east of Zherdevka, Tambov Oblast. It was home to the 14th Guards Leningrad Twice Red Banner Order of Suvorov Fighter Aviation Regiment (14th Guards IAP) which flew Mikoyan MiG-29E (NATO: Fulcrum) aircraft from April 21, 1991 until 1999. The regiment was part of the 16th Air Army.

In 1998 (Butuwski) or 1999 (M. Holm), the regiment moved to Khalino, near Kursk.

123rd Training Aviation Regiment used the site between 1952 and 1990. 35th Fighter Aviation Regiment between 1992 and 1996 with the MiG-29.

References

Soviet Air Force bases
Soviet Air Defence Force bases
Russian Air Force bases